Gazameda is a genus of sea snails, marine gastropod mollusks in the family Turritellidae.

Species
Species within the genus Gazameda include:
 Gazameda gunnii (Reeve, 1849)
 Gazameda iredalei Finlay, 1927
 Gazameda madagascariensis Bozzetti, 2008
 Gazameda tasmanica (Reeve, 1849)
Species brought into synonymy
 Gazameda declivis (Adams & Reeve, 1850): synonym of Turritella declivis Adams & Reeve in Reeve, 1849
 Gazameda decoramen Iredale, 1936: synonym of Colpospira decoramen (Iredale, 1936)
 Gazameda maoria Powell, 1940: synonym of Stiracolpus pagoda (Reeve, 1849)

References

External links
 Iredale T. (1924). Results from Roy Bell's molluscan collections. Proceedings of the Linnean Society of New South Wales, 49: 179-278, pl. 31-36

Turritellidae